is a mountain in the Ōmine Mountains in Japan. It marks part of the border between Totsukawa and Shimokitayama in Yoshino District of Nara Prefecture.

References 
 Geographical Survey Institute

Mountains of Nara Prefecture